Limited may refer to:

Arts and media
Limited Inc, a 1988 book by Jacques Derrida
Limited series (comics), a comic book series with predetermined length

Businesses
Limited Brands, an American company - owners of Victoria's Secret, Bath & Body Works and others
The Limited, an American apparel company

Legal corporate structures
Limited company, a company in which the liability of its members is limited to what they have invested in the company
Limited liability company, a limited company that blends elements of partnership and corporate structures - primarily in the United States
Private company limited by shares, a limited company whose shares are not public - primarily in Commonwealth countries
Private company limited by guarantee, primarily for non-profit organisations - in Britain and Ireland
Public limited company, a limited company whose shares are sold to the public - primarily in Commonwealth countries
Limited partnership, a partially limited company where liability is limited for limited partners, but not general partners
Limited liability partnership, generally a limited company where liability is limited for all partners
Limited liability limited partnership, a limited company where liability is limited for all partners - United States

Transport
Buick Limited, a car produced between 1936 and 1942 and during 1958
Limited express,  a type of train service
Limited, a high-end trim for vehicles of any kind

See also
Limit (disambiguation)
Limitless (disambiguation)
Unlimited (disambiguation)
Limited Edition (disambiguation)